Lieutenant-General Sir Derek Boorman  (born 30 September 1930) is a retired former senior British Army officer.

Military career
Educated at Wolstanton Grammar School and the Royal Military Academy Sandhurst, Boorman was commissioned into the North Staffordshire Regiment in 1950. He was Deputy Assistant Adjutant and Quartermaster General at Headquarters 48th Gurkha Infantry Brigade and subsequently Commander of 51st Brigade in Hong Kong.

He was appointed Director of Military Operations at the Ministry of Defence in 1980 and Commander of British Forces in Hong Kong in 1982. He went on to be Chief of Defence Intelligence in 1985: in that capacity he took the view that the Mikhail Gorbachev's proposals for internal reform and deep cuts in missile stocks were genuine. He retired from the British Army in 1988.

He was also Colonel of the 6th Queen Elizabeth's Own Gurkha Rifles from 1983 to 1988
and Colonel of the Staffordshire Regiment from 1985 to 1990.

Retirement
In October 1992 he was appointed a Member of the Government's Security Commission and in 1996 he accused Government Ministers of being untruthful in their evidence to the Arms to Iraq Inquiry. He retired from the Security Commission in 1998.

In 1994 he became Chairman of the Royal Hospitals Trust – a post he held until 1998. Then in 2000 he became a Deputy Pro-Chancellor of the University of Kent.

References

|-

1930 births
Living people
Knights Commander of the Order of the Bath
North Staffordshire Regiment officers
Royal Gurkha Rifles officers
British Army lieutenant generals
People associated with the University of Kent
People educated at Wolstanton Grammar School